Aukerman is an unincorporated community in Wayne County, in the U.S. state of Ohio.

History
Aukerman was platted at an unknown date. An old variant name was Burbank.

References

Unincorporated communities in Wayne County, Ohio
Unincorporated communities in Ohio